Caroline Furøyen, also known by her stage name Caroline Ailin (born 1989), is a Norwegian singer and songwriter based in London. She co-wrote "New Rules", a single by Dua Lipa which reached number 1 on the UK Singles Chart and US pop radio in 2017. In 2019 Ailin, along with her collaborators Ian Kirkpatrick and Emily Warren, wrote the hit Dua Lipa song Don't Start Now, for which they received nominations for both Record of the Year and Song of the Year at the 63rd Annual Grammy Awards. She has also worked with a variety of other acts including, Zedd, Katy Perry, Clean Bandit, Ellie Goulding, Ella Mai, Louis the Child, MØ, and numerous others.

Early life and education

Ailin was born and grew up in Bodø, Norway. She began making music at age 12 after listening to Alicia Keys' Songs in A Minor. At age 19, she moved to England to attend the Liverpool Institute for Performing Arts (LIPA). While still attending the school in 2011, Ailin performed at Parkenfestivalen, a music festival in her hometown, Bodø. She graduated from LIPA in 2012 with a BA in music. In May 2012, she was among five students to be given studio time with the school's founder, Paul McCartney.

Career

Ailin signed a publishing contract with Oslo-based Waterfall Music in May 2012. She also signed a deal with Sony/ATV Music Publishing. In 2014, she wrote "Crocodile Tears" for the producer, Grades. For her songwriting work in 2015, the Norwegian Music Publisher Association awarded Ailin with the 2016 "Breakthrough of the Year" award. That year, she co-wrote a variety of songs, including Rachel Platten's "Hey Hey Hallelujah" and Olivia Holt's "History", the last of which charted in Belgium, the Netherlands, and other locales.

In 2017, Ailin co-wrote Dua Lipa's single, "New Rules". The song was released in July 2017 and made it to the top of the UK Singles Chart by the following month. It also peaked at number 6 on the Billboard Hot 100 and number 1 on the Mainstream Top 40 charts in the United States in 2018. Ailin later co-wrote and was a featured performer on the Louis the Child song "Last to Leave" released in December 2017. In 2018, the Norwegian Music Publisher Association honored Ailin with the Pop Song of the Year award for her work on "New Rules".

Later in 2018, Ailin co-wrote Clean Bandit's "Mama" featuring Ellie Goulding, which reached number 28 on the Billboard Dance chart. In February 2019, the Katy Perry and Zedd song, "365" (which Ailin co-wrote), was released. Over the course of her career, Ailin has worked with a number of other artists including Zara Larsson, Hailee Steinfeld, Alex Adair, Ella Mai, Snakehips, Aanysa, Four of Diamonds, and numerous others. In 2019 Ailin, along with her collaborators Ian Kirkpatrick (record producer) and Emily Warren wrote the hit Dua Lipa song Don't Start Now.

Discography

Extended plays

Singles

as featured artist

Guest appearances

Songwriting credits

References

Musicians from Bodø
Norwegian songwriters
Norwegian women singers
Norwegian pop singers
Sony Music Publishing artists
Living people
1989 births